A range table was a list of angles of elevation a particular artillery gun barrel needed to be set to, to strike a target at a particular distance with a projectile of a particular weight using a propellant cartridge of a particular weight. They were used for several centuries by field and naval gunners of all countries until gradually replaced by computerised fire-control systems beginning in World War II (1939–1945).

Range table for US 3-inch (76.2 mm) field gun, models 1902-1905 
This gun used a standard "fixed" cartridge with  shell, hence a single set of tables applied to all its ammunition.

Range table for British 3 inch (76.2 mm) Stokes Mortar, 1917 
Different propellant charges were used to achieve required range, angle of descent and flight time. This is typical of mortars and howitzers.

(Provisional) Range Table For 3-Inch Stokes Mortar, Printed in September 1917.
Cartridge :  ballistite, reinforced with Charges : 5 grains, guncotton yarn
Rings : , .3 mm flake cordite
Projectile : Bomb, 10 lb. 11 oz (4.85 kg)

Notes

References 
 (Provisional) Range Table For 3-Inch Stokes Mortar, September 1917. United Kingdom War Office.
 William Westervelt, "Gunnery and explosives for field artillery officers", Government Printing Office, Washington, 1911, Appendix B.

Artillery operation